The 1946 Nankai earthquake (昭和南海地震 Shōwa Nankai jishin) was a great earthquake in Nankaidō, Japan.  It occurred on December 21, 1946, at 04:19 JST (December 20, 19:19 UTC). The earthquake measured between 8.1 and 8.4 on the moment magnitude scale, and was felt from Northern Honshū to Kyūshū. It occurred almost two years after the 1944 Tōnankai earthquake, which ruptured the adjacent part of the Nankai megathrust.

Geology

The Nankai Trough is a convergent boundary where the Philippine Sea Plate is being subducted beneath the Eurasian Plate. Large earthquakes have been recorded along this zone since the 7th century, with a recurrence time of 100 to 200 years.

Earthquake
The 1946 Nankaido earthquake was unusual in its seismological perspective, with a rupture zone estimated from long-period geodetic data that was more than twice as large as that derived from shorter period seismic data. Scientists propose that this seamount might work as a barrier inhibiting brittle seismogenic rupture.

Casualties and damage
The earthquake caused extensive damage, destroying 36,000 homes in southern Honshū alone.  The earthquake also caused a huge tsunami that took out another 2,100 homes with its   waves.

See also
 List of earthquakes in 1946
 List of earthquakes in Japan

References

External links

Nankaido
Nankaido Earthquake, 1946
1946 tsunamis
December 1946 events in Asia
Megathrust earthquakes in Japan
Occupied Japan
Tsunamis in Japan
Earthquakes of the Showa period
1946 disasters in Japan